Niels Lauritsen Aagaard (1612— abt. 22 January 1657), was probably the brother of the poet Christen Aagaard, was professor at Sorø Academy, in Denmark, where he also occupied the office of librarian. He died in 1657, at the age of forty-five, and left behind him several philosophical and critical works, written in Latin, among which are, A Treatise on Subterraneous Fires; Dissertations on Tacitus; Observations on Ammianus Marcellinus; and a Vindication of the Style of the New Testament.

See also

Christen Aagaard

References

1612 births
1657 deaths
Danish male poets
Danish Protestant theologians
Danish philosophers
17th-century Protestant theologians
17th-century Danish poets
17th-century Latin-language writers